IEC 61850 is an international standard defining communication protocols for intelligent electronic devices at electrical substations. It is a part of the International Electrotechnical Commission's (IEC) Technical Committee 57 reference architecture for electric power systems. The abstract data models defined in IEC 61850 can be mapped to a number of protocols. Current mappings in the standard are to Manufacturing Message Specification (MMS), GOOSE (Generic Object Oriented System Event) [see section 3, Terms and definitions, term 3.65 on page 14], SV (Sampled Values) or SMV (Sampled Measure Values), and soon to web services. In the previous version of the standard, GOOSE stood for "Generic Object Oriented Substation Event", but this old definition is still very common in IEC 61850 documentation. These protocols can run over TCP/IP networks or substation LANs using high speed switched Ethernet to obtain the necessary response times below four milliseconds for protective relaying.

Standard documents
IEC 61850 consists of the following parts:
 IEC TR 61850-1:2013 - Introduction and overview
 IEC TS 61850-2:2003 - Glossary
 IEC 61850-3:2013 - General requirements
 IEC 61850-4:2011 - System and project management 
 IEC 61850-5:2013 - Communication requirements for functions and device models
 IEC 61850-6:2009 - Configuration language for communication in electrical substations related to IEDs 
 IEC 61850-7-1:2011 - Basic communication structure - Principles and models 
 IEC 61850-7-2:2010 - Basic communication structure - Abstract communication service interface (ACSI) 
 IEC 61850-7-3:2010 - Basic communication structure - Common Data Classes
 IEC 61850-7-4:2010 - Basic communication structure - Compatible logical node classes and data classes
 IEC 61850-7-410:2012 - Basic communication structure - Hydroelectric power plants - Communication for monitoring and control
 IEC 61850-7-420:2009 - Basic communication structure - Distributed energy resources logical nodes
 IEC TR 61850-7-510:2012 - Basic communication structure - Hydroelectric power plants - Modelling concepts and guidelines
 IEC 61850-8-1:2011 - Specific communication service mapping (SCSM) - Mappings to MMS (ISO 9506-1 and ISO 9506-2) and to ISO/IEC 8802-3
 IEC 61850-9-2:2011 - Specific communication service mapping (SCSM) - Sampled values over ISO/IEC 8802-3
 IEC/IEEE 61850-9-3:2016 - Precision Time Protocol profile for power utility automation
 IEC 61850-10:2012 - Conformance testing
 IEC TS 61850-80-1:2016 - Guideline to exchanging information from a CDC-based data model using IEC 60870-5-101 or IEC 60870-5-104
 IEC TR 61850-80-3:2015 - Mapping to web protocols - Requirements and technical choices
 IEC TS 61850-80-4:2016 - Translation from the COSEM object model (IEC 62056) to the IEC 61850 data model
 IEC TR 61850-90-1:2010 - Use of IEC 61850 for the communication between substations
 IEC TR 61850-90-2:2016 - Using IEC 61850 for communication between substations and control centres
 IEC TR 61850-90-3:2016 - Using IEC 61850 for condition monitoring diagnosis and analysis
 IEC TR 61850-90-4:2013 - Network engineering guidelines
 IEC TR 61850-90-5:2012 - Use of IEC 61850 to transmit synchrophasor information according to IEEE C37.118
 IEC TR 61850-90-7:2013 - Object models for power converters in distributed energy resources (DER) systems
 IEC TR 61850-90-8:2016 - Object model for E-mobility
 IEC TR 61850-90-12:2015 - Wide area network engineering guidelines

Features
IEC 61850 features include:
 Data Modeling — Primary process objects as well as protection and control functionality in the substation is modelled into different standard logical nodes which can be grouped under different logical devices. There are logical nodes for data/functions related to the logical device (LLN0) and physical device (LPHD).
 Reporting Schemes — There are various reporting schemes (BRCB & URCB) for reporting data from server through a server-client relationship which can be triggered based on pre-defined trigger conditions.
 Fast Transfer of events — Generic Substation Events (GSE) are defined for fast transfer of event data for a peer-to-peer communication mode. This is again subdivided into GOOSE & GSSE.
 Setting Groups — The setting group control Blocks (SGCB) are defined to handle the setting groups so that user can switch to any active group according to the requirement.
 Sampled Data Transfer — Schemes are also defined to handle transfer of sampled values using Sampled Value Control blocks (SVCB)
 Commands — Various command types are also supported by IEC 61850 which include direct & select before operate (SBO) commands with normal and enhanced securities.
 Data Storage — Substation Configuration Language (SCL) is defined for complete storage of configured data of the substation in a specific format.

See also
 DNP3
 IEC 60870-5-104
 IEC 61968
 IEC 61970

References

External links 
 Detailed Introduction to IEC 61850
 IEC 61850 Technical Issues website
 UCA International Users Group
 IEC61850: A Protocol with Powerful Potential
 Smart High Voltage Substation Based on IEC 61850 Process Bus and IEEE 1588 Time Synchronization
 Test and evaluation system for multi-protocol sampled value protection schemes by Dr. David M.E. Ingram

Electric power
61850
Smart grid